Poslední muž  is a 1934 Czechoslovak comedy film  directed by Martin Frič and starring Hugo Haas.

Cast
Hugo Haas ...  Prof. Alois Kohout 
Zdeňka Baldová ...  Mrs. Kohoutová 
Marie Glázrová ...  Zdenka, daughter 
Antonín Novotný ...  Jaroslav, son 
Vladimír Borský ...  Dr. Jirí Becvár (as V. Borský) 
Jiřina Steimarová ...  Tonca Vacková 
Darja Hajská ...  Baruska, cooky 
Jára Kohout ...  Frantík 
Václav Trégl ...  Rejsek, janitor 
Bohdan Lachman ...  Director the school 
Milada Gampeová...  Liduska Pivodová 
Josef Kotalík ...  Station master 
Emanuel Hríbal ...  Sadar 
Josef Mach ...  Student 
Alois Dvorský ...  Teacher

References

External links 
 

1934 films
1930s Czech-language films
1934 comedy films
Czechoslovak black-and-white films
Films directed by Martin Frič
Czechoslovak comedy films
1930s Czech films